Zahir Uddin Piar is a Bangladeshi film actor. He won Bangladesh National Film Award for Best Performance in a Negative Role for the film Chandragrohon (2003)

Selected films
 Ekattorer Jishu - 1993
 Bikkhov - 1994
 Bichar Hobe - 1996
 Shopner Prithibi - 1996
 Shopner Nayok - 1997
 Sagarika - 1998
 Jhor - 2000
 Oder Dhor - 2002
 Chandragrohon - 2008
 Coxbazar Kakatua - 2016

Awards and nominations
National Film Awards

References

External links

Bangladeshi film actors
Best Performance in a Negative Role National Film Award (Bangladesh) winners
Living people
Year of birth unknown
Year of birth missing (living people)